Montreux '77 is an album by Count Basie and his orchestra, recorded at the 1977 Montreux Jazz Festival.

Track listing 
 "The Heat's On" (Sammy Nestico) – 3:39
 "Freckle Face" (Nestico) – 6:04
 "Splanky" (Neal Hefti) – 4:34
 "The More I See You" (Mack Gordon, Harry Warren) – 3:41
 "A Night in Tunisia" (Dizzy Gillespie, Frank Paparelli) – 4:53
 "Hittin' 12" (Harrison) – 2:23
 "Bag of Dreams" (Jimmy Forrest) – 6:14
 "Things Ain't What They Used to Be" (Mercer Ellington, Ted Persons) – 4:14
 "I Needs to Be Bee'd With" (Quincy Jones) – 5:07
 "Li'l Darlin'" (Hefti) – 4:44
 "Jumpin' at the Woodside" (Count Basie, Jon Hendricks) – 3:50
 "One O'Clock Jump" (Basie) – 3:28

Personnel 
The Count Basie Orchestra
 Count Basie - piano
 Al Grey - trombone
 Dennis Wilson - trombone
 Mel Wanzo - trombone
 Bill Hughes - trombone
 Waymon Reed - trumpet
 Lin Biviano - trumpet
 Sonny Cohn - trumpet
 Bobby Mitchell - trumpet
 Jimmy Forrest - tenor saxophone
 Eric Dixon - tenor saxophone
 Danny Turner - saxophone
 Bobby Plater - alto saxophone
 Charlie Fowlkes - baritone saxophone
 Freddie Green - guitar
 John Duke - double bass
 Butch Miles - drums

References 

1977 live albums
Count Basie Orchestra live albums
Albums recorded at the Montreux Jazz Festival
Pablo Records live albums
Albums produced by Norman Granz